Within Unlimited, Inc, or commonly Within, is a studio based in Los Angeles developing the VR fitness service Supernatural on Meta Quest. The company was founded by Chris Milk and Aaron Koblin in 2014 and initially created, acquired, and distributed 360-degree video, AR, and VR experiences across web, mobile, console, and headsets. The company was acquired by Meta Platforms in February 2023.

History
Originally named Vrse, Within was founded in 2014 by Chris Milk, and Aaron Koblin, creator of Google’s Data Arts team. The company has produced and distributed some of augmented and virtual reality's most seminal works, including Clouds Over Sidra, in partnership with the United Nations (2015), Lambchild Superstar (2017), co-directed by Milk and OK Go's Damien Kulash, and the children's augmented reality reading app, Wonderscope (2018). In April 2020, after 2 years in development, Within released Supernatural, an in-home fitness, health, and wellness service for virtual reality, which combines real-life trainers with rhythm mapped exercises set in beautiful locations. In 2020, Within was named one of FastCompany's Most Innovative Companies and Supernatural was named "Best App" in Fast Company's 2020 Innovation by Design Awards.

In October 2021, Meta Platforms agreed to buy Within for an undisclosed sum. In July 2022, the U.S. Federal Trade Commission sued Meta to block the acquisition arguing that "Meta could have chosen to try to compete. Instead, it chose to buy." In February 2023, the FTC lost its case against Meta in federal court, allowing Meta to acquire the company. The acquisition completed the following week.

In October 2022, Within sold the Wonderscope app to Amira Learning for an undisclosed amount. In February 2023, the Within app shut down "to focus exclusively on building Supernatural".

Investors
On June 16, 2016, Within rebranded from Vrse and raised a $12.65 million Series A round led by Andreessen Horowitz, with participation from 21st Century Fox, WME, Tribeca Enterprises, Annapurna Pictures, Vice and Freelands Ventures. Current investors include Andreessen Horowitz, Temasek, Emerson Collective, 21st Century Fox, Raine Ventures, WME, Live Nation, Vice Media, Tribeca Enterprises, Annapurna Pictures, and Legendary Pictures.

In 2017, Within announced it had raised a $40 million Series B round of funding led by Temasek and Emerson Collective including from existing investors Andreessen Horowitz, 21st Century Fox and Raine Ventures, and new investors WPP and Macro Ventures.

Installations & Events
In 2016, Within (known as VRSE at the time) showed roughly 1,200 attendees a synced 360-degree video collage at a TED Talk.

Awards
Within was named the #1 VR app for iOS by Apple Insider, featured as "Best New App" on iTunes and is the most downloaded and highest rated cinematic VR app for Google Cardboard.

Within VR films were selected for the Tribeca Film Festival and chosen for the Sundance Film Festival, respectively, in both 2015 and 2016. Within film, "The Displaced", won the Most Next Award at the 2016 AICP Awards and the 2016 Cannes Lions Grand Prix in the Entertainment category. Within Founder Chris Milk’s SNL40 VR special won the Best Online Film & Video Award at the 2016 Webby Awards. Milk’s "Clouds Over Sidra" won the Interactive Category at the 2015 Sheffield Doc/Fest Awards. In 2020 Within was named one of Fast Company's Most Innovative Companies. Within's Supernatural won "Best App" in Fast Company's 2020 Innovation by Design Awards.

References

Virtual reality companies
Companies based in Los Angeles
2014 establishments in California
2023 mergers and acquisitions
Meta Platforms acquisitions